Treichl is a surname. Notable people with the surname include:

 Andreas Treichl (born 1952), Austrian bank manager
 Markus Treichl (born 1993), Austrian bobsledder
 Traudl Treichl (born 1950), German skier

German-language surnames